Birchdale is an unincorporated community in Koochiching County, Minnesota, United States.

The community is located between International Falls and Baudette on State Highway 11 (MN 11), 42 miles west of International Falls and 26 miles east of Baudette, within Northwest Koochiching Unorganized Territory

Franz Jevne State Park and the Rainy River are both in the vicinity.

Popular events include the annual 4 July and Holiday Lights parades.

Media

Television

References

 Rand McNally Road Atlas – 2007 edition – Minnesota entry
 Official State of Minnesota Highway Map – 2011/2012 edition
 Mn/DOT map of Koochiching County – Sheet 3 – 2011 edition

Unincorporated communities in Minnesota
Unincorporated communities in Koochiching County, Minnesota